September Tapes is a faux-documentary feature film co-written and directed by Christian Johnston in his feature debut. An early review of the film's promotional trailer noted that the footage looked "more real than network news footage".

Distribution
The film was first presented at the Sundance Film Festival in January 2004, where First Look Media acquired worldwide distribution rights. In May of the same year, it was featured at the Cannes Film Festival.

The film screened at many other film festivals, including: the Deauville American Film Festival, France; the Copenhagen International Documentary Festival, Denmark; the Amsterdam Fantastic Film Festival, Netherlands; and others.

The film is translated to "Septiembre Negro" ("Black September") for Spanish-language audiences.

See also
Zero Dark Thirty

References

External links
 
 
September Tapes at the Sundance film festival - From The Economist, Print Edition, January 29, 2004

2004 films
2004 drama films
2000s thriller films
Films based on the September 11 attacks
Found footage films
American drama films
2000s English-language films
2000s American films